{{DISPLAYTITLE:Nu1 Coronae Borealis}}

Nu1 Coronae Borealis is a solitary, red-hued star located in the northern constellation of Corona Borealis. It is faintly visible to the naked eye, having an apparent visual magnitude of 5.20. At that distance, the visual magnitude is diminished by an extinction of 0.1 due to interstellar dust. This object is drifting closer with a radial velocity of −13 km/s.

This is an evolved red giant star with a stellar classification of M2 III. It is a variable star of uncertain type, showing a change in brightness with an amplitude of 0.0114 magnitude and a frequency of 0.22675 cycles per day, or 4.41 days/cycle. It has about 67 times the Sun's radius and is radiating 975 times the Sun's luminosity from its photosphere at an effective temperature of 3,936 K.

References

Corona Borealis, Nu1
Corona Borealis
Corona Borealis, Nu1
Durchmusterung objects
Coronae Borealis, 20
147749
080197
6107